Wini is a village in the Nusa Tenggara Timur province of Indonesia. It is the capital of the North Insana subdistrict (Kecamatan Insana Utara) of the North Central Timor Regency (Kabupaten Timor Tengah Utara). It is located on the north coast of the western part of the island of Timor, between East Timor to the east and its exclave of Oecusse to the west. A major border crossing checkpoint (pos lintas batas negara) into East Timor's exclave of Oecussi is located here.

Location
Wini is located on the north coast of the island of Timor. It is about 45km north Kefamenanu, the capital city of North Central Timor Regency within which Wini is located. The village is on the East Timor-Indonesia border, just east of the border with East Timor's Oecusse border.

Tourism
Wini's main tourism attraction is the beach, which is popular as a weekend destination for the local population. The main beaches are Wini Beach (Pantai Wini) and Idola Beach (Pantai Idola). Another popular beach is Cape Bastian (Tanjung Bastian) located 8km to the east of Wini. Besides beaches, the new Wini Border Crossing Checkpoint complex (see below) is also a popular attraction.

Transport and Infrastructure
Roads connect Wini with Kefamenanu 45km to the south via Manamas. A coastal road also links Wini with the main Kupang–Dili road about 53km to the east. From the intersection, it is a further 22km to Mota'ain, where the border crossing into East Timor proper is located. This route between these two border crossings the shortest between East Timor proper and its Oecussi exclave. To the west, a road crosses the border river to Sacato (sometimes spelled Sakato) and onward to Pante Macassar, the capital of Oecusse.

Wini has a harbor. Manganese ore is exported via the port, but only ships with less than 5000 gross tons can dock.

Border crossing

The Wini border crossing checkpoint is a modern complex comprising customs, immigration and quarantine facilities catering to pedestrian and vehicular traffic crossing between Indonesia and East Timor. The checkpoint on the East Timor side of the border is Sakato. The new border crossing checkpoint complex was developed at a cost of 130 billion rupiah beginning 2015 and was officially inaugurated on 9 January 2018. The complex, which is located on a  site, replaced an earlier border crossing facilities which were housed in small buildings.

References

Populated places in East Nusa Tenggara
East Timor–Indonesia border crossings